Leelanau State Park is a public recreation area covering  on the Leelanau Peninsula in Leelanau County, Michigan. The state park encompasses the entire tip of the peninsula and is the home of the Grand Traverse Lighthouse Museum.

Activities and amenities
In addition to the lighthouse museum, the park offers 8.5 miles of hiking and skiing trails, picnicking, playground, cabins, and rustic camping.

References

External links
Leelanau State Park Michigan Department of Natural Resources
Leelanau State Park Map Michigan Department of Natural Resources

State parks of Michigan
Protected areas of Leelanau County, Michigan
Protected areas established in 1964
1964 establishments in Michigan
IUCN Category III